The Federation of Rhodesia and Nyasaland general election of 15 December 1953 was the first election to the legislative assembly of the Federation of Rhodesia and Nyasaland, which had been formed a few months before. The election saw a landslide victory for the Federal Party under Godfrey Huggins, who had been Prime Minister of Southern Rhodesia for the past 20 years.

Composition of the Federal Assembly
Voters elected 35 members of a unicameral Federal Assembly: 14 from Southern Rhodesia constituencies, 8 from Northern Rhodesia constituencies, and four from Nyasaland. In addition, there were three members from each territory representing African interests: one of these was a European and two were African. In Southern Rhodesia only, these positions were elected; in the other territories, the Governor appointed the European member, while an electoral college chose the African members.

Electoral qualifications
When the Federal constitution was agreed at the London conference of 1953, the qualification for electors in Northern and Southern Rhodesia was taken as the same as those in operation for territorial elections in those territories. Nyasaland did not have direct elections at this point and so was excluded until the Legislative Council there enacted proper provisions.

At the election day, the electorate was comprised as follows:

Election campaign
The advent of the Federation caused a profound shift in the structure of politics in the Rhodesias. Godfrey Huggins formed the Federal Party to fight the election, merging his own United Party with the opposition Rhodesia Party and incorporating supporters in Northern Rhodesia and Nyasaland. Several members of other opposition parties in Southern Rhodesia who supported federation also decided to join the Federal Party. Among them were William Eastwood, from the Rhodesia Labour Party, whose departure was prompted by the initial decision of his Party to fight the elections: Eastwood felt that this would divide supporters of federation. Another opposition member going over to the Federal Party was Ian Smith, who had been elected as a Liberal candidate in the 1948 general election.

Opponents of federation formed the Confederate Party, which advocated a system in the Rhodesias akin to apartheid in South Africa. This issue was also raised by Huggins who campaigned vigorously against it. Huggins believed the policy was unpopular and impractical. A group called the Progressive Party was formed to offer voters a party of the centre-left, but swiftly dissolved when it found organising a difficulty and realised it would not be able to nominate more than about two candidates. There were a few independent candidates, most notably two in Northern Rhodesia. Dr Alexander Scott in Lusaka and Norman Lacey in the copperbelt constituency of Nkana-Chingola both advocated a liberal racial policy similar to that which the Progressive Party had been intending to offer.

One unusual court case arose after nominations. Gaston Thornicroft, a mixed-race man who was described as "living like a European", was refused nomination for the Southern Rhodesia constituency for Europeans to represent African interests on the grounds that he was not a European. He challenged the decision in court but was unsuccessful.

Results

The state of the parties was:

Constituency results

Northern Rhodesia

Ordinary members

Specially elected African members

Specially appointed European member

Nyasaland

Ordinary members

Specially elected African members

Specially appointed European member

Southern Rhodesia

Ordinary members

Specially elected African members

Specially elected European member

Changes during the Assembly

Southern Rhodesia by-election
Rev. Percy Ibbotson, the specially elected European member representing African interests from Southern Rhodesia, died on 3 April 1955. When nominations closed on 27 May 1955, Harry Ellinder Davies was the only candidate to replace him, and was therefore declared elected unopposed.

Kafue by-election
Guy Van Eeden, who became increasingly opposed to Federal Party policies, was expelled from the party in July 1955 and responded by resigning on 8 July 1955 to seek re-election in his constituency of Kafue (Northern Rhodesia). The by-election was held on 6 October 1955.

Sebakwe by-election
J.R. Dendy Young, the Confederate Party member for Sebakwe (Southern Rhodesia), was appointed as a Judge. He resigned on 26 January 1956, and the by-election to succeed him was held on 5 April 1956. By this time, the Confederate Party had been dissolved and replaced by the Dominion Party.

Mrewa by-election
Neville Barrett, the Federal Party member for Mrewa (Southern Rhodesia) died on 15 April 1957. The by-election to replace him was held on 6 June 1957.

Mashonaland by-election
Jasper Savanhu, the specially elected African member for Mashonaland (Southern Rhodesia), had problems with the proposed new constitution in terms of its provisions for voters' qualifications. Although his responsibility was to represent the views of Africans, his electorate were predominantly Europeans. He therefore decided to vote for the proposals, but immediately to resign (1 August 1957) and seek re-election. When nominations closed on 27 September 1957, he was the only candidate nominated, and was therefore declared elected unopposed.

Seat vacant at dissolution
Paul Brereton (Federal Party), one of the ordinary members for Nyasaland, died on 21 July 1958. The seat was left vacant due to the imminent federal election.

Sources
Colin Leys, "An Election in Nyasaland." Political Studies, Vol. 5, No. 3 (1957).

1953 elections in Africa
Elections in the Federation of Rhodesia and Nyasaland
1953 in the Federation of Rhodesia and Nyasaland
December 1953 events in Africa